Gary Barrymore Raymond (born 20 April 1935) is an English film, television and theatre actor.

Biography
Gary Raymond was born in Brixton, London, the younger of twins and the youngest of three brothers, to theatrical parents, both of whom were variety artistes. His mother died of tuberculosis within nine months of the twins' birth, and the two were then in the care of a nanny. When Raymond was eleven years old, he won a scholarship to the Gateway School and remained there until he was sixteen.

After training at The Royal Academy of Dramatic Art, Raymond worked with the Royal Shakespeare Company in the 1950s, playing roles such as Macbeth, Oberon and Claudius, and others. He made his film debut as Charles Stuart (King Charles II) in the British swashbuckling film The Moonraker (1958). He soon followed up with his role as Cliff Lewis in Tony Richardson's film adaptation of John Osborne's Look Back in Anger (1958), opposite Richard Burton and Mary Ure. Subsequent notable films included: Suddenly, Last Summer (1959), in which he appeared with Katharine Hepburn, Mercedes McCambridge and Elizabeth Taylor; The Millionairess (1960), where Raymond played Sophia Loren's character's husband; El Cid (1961), an epic film in which he played opposite Charlton Heston and Loren; The Playboy of the Western World (1962), which he starred in; Jason and the Argonauts (1963), a fantasy film; and The Greatest Story Ever Told (1965), where he portrayed the apostle Simon bar Jonah, who became Saint Peter.

Raymond's broad theatrical career began in the mid 1950s, and he has continued appearing on stage all throughout his film and television career. Notable productions include She Loves Me, Treasure Island, Irma La Douce, The Sound of Music, Grand Hotel, The Complaisant Lover, As You Like It, Hamlet, The Crucifer of Blood, Twelfth Night, Full Circle, Look After Lulu!, Dick Turpin, Lysistrata, Frost at Midnight, The Numbered, Electra, Castle in Sweden, The World of Susie Wong, Gentlemen Prefer Blondes, A Midsummer Night's Dream, Troilus and Cressida, The Jungle Book, Peer Gynt, The Trackers of Oxyrhynchus, The Good Person of Sichuan, My Children My Africa, The Beaux Stratagem, Bent, Sunday in the Park with George, The Wind in the Willows and Follies, as well as dozens of others.

He is also well known for his role as Sergeant Jack Moffitt in the late-1960s American television show, The Rat Patrol (1966–68), which ran for two seasons.

Raymond has been married since 1961 to actress Delena Kidd, with whom he has three children: Matthew, Sophie and the youngest, actress Emily Raymond.

Filmography

References

External links
 

Living people
1935 births
People from Brixton
English male stage actors
English male film actors
English male television actors
Alumni of RADA